In Song and Dance is a 1964 Australian documentary about the Northern Territory Eisteddfodd held between July 4–13, 1964.

References

External links

1964 films
1960s short documentary films
Films directed by Lee Robinson
Australian short documentary films
1960s English-language films